Billbergia sanderiana is a plant species in the genus Billbergia. This species is endemic to Brazil.

References

BSI Cultivar Registry Retrieved 11 October 2009

sanderiana
Endemic flora of Brazil
Flora of the Atlantic Forest
Garden plants of South America